Livan may refer to:

People
LIVAN, a UK-based alternative rock trio 
Liván Hernández (b. 1975), Cuban baseball player
Liván López (b. 1982), Cuban wrestler

Places
Lebanon
Livan, East Azerbaijan, a village in East Azerbaijan Province, Iran
Livan-e Gharbi, a village in Golestan Province, Iran
Livan-e Sharqi, a village in Golestan Province, Iran
Livan Rural District, in Golestan Province, Iran